Litoreibacter albidus is a Gram-negative, strictly aerobic and non-motile bacterium from the genus of Litoreibacter which has been isolated from the sea snail Umbonium costatum from the Sea of Japan.

References 

Rhodobacteraceae
Bacteria described in 2014